Mythimna languida is a species of moth of the family Noctuidae. It is found in almost all parts of tropical and subtropical Africa, Asia and the Mediterranean basin.

Adults are on wing year-round. There are multiple generations per year.

Recorded food plants include Arundo phragmites in Italy and Lavatera species in Egypt.

External links
Hadeninae of Israel
Lepiforum.de

Mythimna (moth)
Owlet moths of Africa
Moths of Europe
Moths of Cape Verde
Moths of Africa
Moths of the Middle East
Moths described in 1858